Vladimír Venglár (20 February 1923 – 5 July 1977) was a Slovak footballer who played as a defender and appeared for both the Slovakia and Czechoslovakia national teams.

Career
Venglár made his international debut for Slovakia on 23 August 1942 in a friendly match against Romania, which finished as a 1–0 win in Bratislava. He earned his second and final cap for the country the following month on 6 September in a friendly match against Croatia, which finished as a 1–6 loss in Zagreb. He later represented the Czechoslovakia national team, making his first appearance on 10 October 1948 in the 1948–53 Central European International Cup against Switzerland, which finished as a 1–1 draw in Basel. He was capped eight times for Czechoslovakia, making his final appearance on 20 May 1951 in a friendly against Romania, which finished as a 2–2 draw in Prague.

Personal life
Venglár died on 5 July 1977 at the age of 54.

Career statistics

International

References

General references

External links
 
 
 

1923 births
1977 deaths
Slovak footballers
Slovakia international footballers
Czechoslovak footballers
Czechoslovakia international footballers
Dual internationalists (football)
Association football defenders
ŠK Slovan Bratislava players
FK Inter Bratislava players
Czechoslovak First League players